American Satan is a 2017 American supernatural musical thriller film directed by Ash Avildsen, who also wrote the screenplay with Marty Beckerman. It was released in theaters on Friday October 13, 2017 and stars Andy Biersack, Ben Bruce, Drake Bell, Denise Richards, Malcolm McDowell, Booboo Stewart, and Tori Black. The film marked Larry King's final film role before his death in January 2021. It won an award for Best Narrative Feature at the 2017 Oceanside International Film Festival.

Plot 
The Relentless are an aspiring rock band, half from England and half from the US, who all move to Los Angeles to become famous. The band's vocalist, Johnny Faust, lives in Columbus, Ohio with his mother and his girlfriend Gretchen. After moving to Los Angeles they hold auditions for a bassist, and choose a woman, Lily. While leaving a liquor store, some of the members encounter a homeless man who tells them to rely on feeling more than perception. Moments later, the band is accosted by another man who implies he is the Devil and can make them stars if they perform a human sacrifice. Lily tells Johnny that her ex-band member Damien raped her the night she left the band. Johnny learns his mother has breast cancer and cannot afford treatment. Damien insults Johnny's mother, so the band decides to sacrifice Damien. They lock him in a van and set it aflame, but Johnny has a change of heart and lets Damien out. Damien climbs an electrical fence and dies from electrocution.

The Relentless get a record deal and record an album, called American Satan. They go on tour. In Kansas, a bar fight results in the death of a man, and Johnny is arrested. He goes on trial and is acquitted. This inspires The Relentless's fans to confront their bullies, leading to more deaths, all blamed on the band.

Johnny and Gretchen try to maintain their long-distance relationship, but matters are complicated when Johnny and Lily sleep together. At the same time, Ricky overdoses on cocaine and dies. This leads to Leo heavily using alcohol and pills. Gretchen dumps Johnny, and he turns to heroin and sex with Lily to try to cope. A fan's mother gets Johnny to take her teen daughter's virginity; he does, while Dylan has sex with the mother. They later learn that the girl's dad killed himself because of this. Johnny overdoses on heroin and almost dies, but is revived by a paramedic - the homeless man the group encountered outside the liquor store. Johnny goes to rehab. Lily refuses to go to rehab and disappears. American Satan is well-received and tops the charts. The band performs more shows and receive a lot of adoration but also a lot of backlash, leading them to almost quit the music industry.

The band is successful, and Johnny's mother receives treatment for her cancer, which goes into remission. Johnny tries to get back together with Gretchen to no avail. The Relentless land a gig at a music festival but the Devil says that they have to kill a man during their performance, though he intends to make it look like part of the concert. The night of the show, Lily returns. A moment later, the Devil appears in the guise of Johnny's mother's new boyfriend, and when the band goes on stage and performs, Johnny takes the gun and first holds it to his head before shooting and killing the Devil. He is arrested. While in prison, Johnny is visited by the archangel Gabriel - the homeless man. He tells Johnny he has a choice in his future and to go with his feelings. He is also visited by Gretchen who tells Johnny she still loves him. She brings with her a lawyer, Damien's father. The lawyer gets Johnny off on a technicality.

Cast 
 Andy Biersack as Johnny Faust, lead singer of The Relentless. Johnny's singing is performed by Remington Leith of Palaye Royale
 Malcolm McDowell as Mr. Capricorn
 John Bradley as Ricky Rollins, Manager of The Relentless
 Booboo Stewart as Vic Lakota, one of the two guitarist of The Relentless. Guitar sound by Lee McKinney of Born of Osiris
 Mark Boone Junior as Elias Collins, owner/head of the Akkadian Records
 Ben Bruce as Leo Donovan, one of the two guitarist of The Relentless
 Jesse Sullivan as Lily Mayflower, bassist of The Relentless
 Olivia Culpo as Gretchen, Johnny's girlfriend
 Sebastian Gregory as Dylan James, drummer of The Relentless
 Bill Goldberg as Hawk, The Relentless' tour manager
 Larry King as himself
 Bill Duke as Gabriel, the arch angel
 Denise Richards as Ms Faust, Johnny's mother
 Drake Bell as Damien Collins, member/leader of the band called Damien's Inferno
 Tori Black as Cassandra

Reception
On review aggregator Rotten Tomatoes, the film has an approval rating of 78% based on reviews from nine critics, with an average rating of 8/10.

Emilie Black of Cinema Crazed gave the film 4 out of 5 and wrote: "American Satan is a film it might take time for fans to discover but it will more than likely get a following in the next few years."
Bobby LePire of Film Threat gave it a grade of A- and wrote: "American Satan doesn't put enough time toward one of the most crucial relationships in the movie for it to work. But the acting is excellent, the directing is stylized and energetic, the characters are interesting, the ending is remarkable."

Kaitlyn Tiffany of The Verge gave it a negative review: "In the space of 90 minutes, it captures some of the worst acting ever committed to film..." saying that star Andy Biersack has no acting ability whatsoever.

Television series

A TV series spin-off, Paradise City, was announced as a continuation of the film. Andy Biersack and Ben Bruce along with other cast members reprise their roles from the film. Cameron Boyce makes a posthumous appearance in the show playing the role of Simon. Kellin Quinn of the band Sleeping With Sirens is to also appear in the show, as is Randy Blythe of Lamb of God and Sid Wilson of Slipknot.

The first season of the show has eight episodes. A teaser was released on May 1 and the official trailer was posted onto the Sumerian Records YouTube channel on December 10, 2020.  The series was released on Amazon Prime Video on March 25, 2021, while also being available to purchase on other platforms.

See also
 Faust
 Deal with the Devil

References

External links 
 
  
 
 American Satan (2017) at The Numbers
 American Satan Official Trailer
 American Satan Official Site

2017 LGBT-related films
2010s supernatural thriller films
American supernatural thriller films
The Devil in film
Films about kidnapping
Films about musical groups
Films directed by Ash Avildsen
Films set in Los Angeles
Films set in Ohio
Heavy metal films
Lesbian-related films
Films about rape
2010s English-language films
2010s American films